Bucculatrix pannonica is a species of moth in the family Bucculatricidae. It was described by G. Deschka in 1982. It is found in Austria and Slovakia.

The length of the forewings is about 4 mm.

References

Natural History Museum Lepidoptera generic names catalog

Bucculatricidae
Moths described in 1982
Moths of Europe